The 1920–21 Irish Cup was the 41st edition of the premier knock-out cup competition in Irish football. 

Glentoran won the tournament for the 3rd time, defeating Glenavon 2–0 in the final at Windsor Park. This was the final tournament organised on an all-Ireland basis as the partition of Ireland process began in May 1921, and the FAI Cup was subsequently founded as an equivalent cup competition for teams in Southern Ireland (present-day Republic of Ireland).

Results

First round

|}

Replay

|}

Quarter-finals

|}

Replay

|}

Semi-finals

|}

1Glenavon advanced into the final after Shelbourne refused to play on 17th March which was set as the semi-final replay date.

Final

References

External links
 Northern Ireland Cup Finals. Rec.Sport.Soccer Statistics Foundation (RSSSF)

Irish Cup seasons
1920–21 domestic association football cups
1920–21 in Irish association football